Thank You Lord is a contemporary worship music album recorded by Don Moen. The album was released on April 6, 2004, by Integrity Music, Hosanna! Music, Christian Broadcasting Network, Epic Records, and Sony Music Entertainment. On March 5, 2005, was recognized by Billboard Magazine, charting No. 15 on the Top Christian Albums and No. 22 on the Heatseekers.

Recording 
Thank You Lord was recorded on October 3, 2003, during a live worship service at Regent University, located in Virginia Beach, Virginia. The school was founded by the American televangelist Pat Robertson, president and founder of the Christian Broadcasting Network. The recording featured worship leader, Don Moen, along with the Kingdom Choir of Tide Water and the Brentwood Baptist Church Worship Choir.

Track listing 
"This Is Your House" – 4:35 
"Arise" – 6:01
"Thank You Lord" – 5:59
"Creator King" – 4:59
"Throne of Praise" – 6:37
"Rescue" – 5:58
"I Need Thee Every Hour" – 2:19
"At The Foot of the Cross (Ashes To Beauty)" – 5:14
"Mi Corazon" – 5:02
"Worthy of Praises" – 5:14
"Jesus You Are My Healer" – 7:00
"All To You" / "I Surrender All" – 5:46
"Wonderful Magnificent God" – 5:33
"When It's All Been Said and Done" – 3:30

Credits 
Producer
 David Hamilton – producer

Executive Producers
 Don Moen – Executive producer
 Gordon P. Robertson – Executive producer for CBN
 Chris Thomason – Executive producer, A&R

Worship leader
 Don Moen – Worship leader

Vocals
 Leanne Albrecht – vocals
 Travis Cottrell – vocals
 Rachel Robinson – vocals
 Maribeth Johnson – vocals
 Mandisa – vocals
 Drew Cline – vocals
 Scott Griffiths – assistant vocals

Musicians
 Mark Baldwin – acoustic guitar, electric guitar, guitar (nylon string)
 Raymond Boyd – drums
 Skip Cleavinger – whistle, Uilleann pipes
 Tom Hemby – acoustic guitar, mandolin, electric guitar
 David Hamilton – keyboards
 Blair Masters – keyboards, Hammond organ
 Don Moen – piano, fiddle
 Matt Pierson – bass

References 

Don Moen live albums
2004 live albums
Epic Records albums
Columbia Records albums
2004 video albums
Live video albums